Torodora phuruaensis is a moth in the family Lecithoceridae. It was described by Kyu-Tek Park in 2007. It is found in Thailand.

Etymology
The species name refers to Phu Ruea in Thailand, the collecting locality of the holotype.

References

Moths described in 2007
Torodora